The 1928–29 Indiana Hoosiers men's basketball team represented Indiana University. Their head coach was Everett Dean, who was in his 5th year. Due to growing popularity of the sport, the team moved to The Fieldhouse in Bloomington, Indiana to play its home games, and was a member of the Big Ten Conference.

The Hoosiers finished the regular season with an overall record of 7–10 and a conference record of 4–8, finishing 8th in the Big Ten Conference.

Roster

Schedule/Results

|-
!colspan=8| Regular Season
|-

References

Indiana
Indiana Hoosiers men's basketball seasons
Indiana Hoosiers
Indiana Hoosiers